The New Zealand Institute of Architects Gold Medal is an award presented annually by the Te Kāhui Whaihanga New Zealand Institute of Architects (NZIA) to a New Zealand architect.

History 
From 1927 until 1977 a gold, silver or bronze prize was awarded each for the design of a public building and was judged by the Royal institute of British Architects. In 1978 a "National Award" replaced the Gold Medal. 

The Gold Medal was reintroduced in 1999 and was awarded to an architect who, over a period of time, made an outstanding contribution to the practice of architecture, as demonstrated through the production of a consistently high-quality body of work.

Recipients (1927 to 1956)

Recipients (since 1999)

References

Architecture awards
Awards established in 1927
New Zealand awards
Architecture in New Zealand